Horse sense may mean:
Common sense
Horse Sense, a 1999 film by the Disney Channel
The senses of the horse
Horse Sense (public information film), a United Kingdom public information film produced by the British Horse Society.